is a Japanese anime series directed by Osamu Dezaki that aired on NHK-BS2 from July 14, 1991 to May 31, 1992.  It was based on the 1975 manga of the same name by Riyoko Ikeda, about an ordinary girl that attends a prestigious girls' school.

Note that the English translations of these titles are unofficial. There were six OVAs produced as summary episodes, and they aired during the run of the anime.

The series has been released on VHS, on laserdisc, and in a DVD box set in 2002.

References

Dear Brother